George "Red Tiger" Ashie born in Accra is a Ghanaian professional super feather/light/light welterweight boxer of the 2000s and 2010s who won the African Boxing Union super featherweight title, Universal Boxing Council (UBC) Super Featherweight title, and Commonwealth lightweight title, and was a challenger for the World Boxing Association (WBA) International lightweight title against Emmanuel Tagoe, and Commonwealth super featherweight title against Kevin Mitchell, his professional fighting weight varied from , i.e. super featherweight to , i.e. light welterweight.

References

External links

Image - George Ashie

Lightweight boxers
Light-welterweight boxers
Living people
Boxers from Accra
Super-featherweight boxers
Year of birth missing (living people)
Ghanaian male boxers
African Boxing Union champions